CNews is a French television channel.

CNews may also refer to:

 CNEWS (Bangladeshi magazine), a Bangladeshi technology magazine
 CNews (newspaper), a French newspaper
 CNews (Russian magazine), a Russian technology magazine